Francisco José "Fran" Navarro Aliaga  (born 3 February 1998) is a Spanish footballer who plays as a forward for Primeira Liga club Gil Vicente.

Club career
Born in Valencia, Navarro moved as a youth across the city from Levante UD to Valencia CF, where he played mostly with the reserve team in Segunda División B. He had his sole call-up for the first team for their La Liga match at home to Villarreal CF on 26 January 2019, due to Kévin Gameiro's injury; he did not leave the substitutes' bench in the 3–0 win.

On 11 July 2019, Navarro was loaned to K.S.C. Lokeren Oost-Vlaanderen of the Belgian First Division B for the upcoming season. He scored his first professional goal on 26 September, in a 4–2 extra-time loss to Royal Antwerp F.C. in the seventh round of the national cup, and netted his only league goal on 5 October in a 3–2 win at leaders OH Leuven.

Navarro moved to Gil Vicente F.C. of Portugal's Primeira Liga on 26 June 2021, on a three-year contract. On his league debut on 9 August, he scored twice in a 3–0 win over visitors Boavista FC. With 16 goals in 32 games, he finished fourth among the league's top scorers while his team qualified for Europe for the first time with fifth position and a berth in the UEFA Europa Conference League.

Career statistics

Club

References

External links

1998 births
Living people
Footballers from Valencia (city)
Spanish footballers
Spain youth international footballers
Spanish expatriate footballers
Association football forwards
Segunda División players
Valencia CF Mestalla footballers
Valencia CF players
K.S.C. Lokeren Oost-Vlaanderen players
Challenger Pro League players
Primeira Liga players
Gil Vicente F.C. players
Spanish expatriate sportspeople in Belgium
Spanish expatriate sportspeople in Portugal
Expatriate footballers in Belgium
Expatriate footballers in Portugal